The Castaway is a Mickey Mouse animated short feature released on March 27, 1931, as part of the Mickey Mouse film series. It was the twenty-seventh Mickey Mouse short to be produced, the third of that year.

The Castaway was the first cartoon directed by Wilfred Jackson, who would go on to direct many Disney feature films, including Cinderella, Alice in Wonderland, Peter Pan and Lady and the Tramp. The circumstances were far from ideal: under pressure from distributors for another film and with little time to produce one, Disney tapped Jackson to produce a short made up of reused animation from other films. The short uses recycled footage of a dancing gorilla (from 1929's Jungle Rhythm), a lion getting eaten by a crocodile (cut from Jungle Rhythm) and dancing seal lions (from 1929's Wild Waves).

The short is also the first to be scored by Frank Churchill, who went on to write the songs for Three Little Pigs, Snow White and the Seven Dwarfs, Dumbo, Bambi and The Adventures of Ichabod and Mr. Toad.

Plot
Stranded on a lonely raft in the ocean, Mickey Mouse spies an island ahead. He reaches the island with the unwilling help of a local swordfish. Hungry, he shakes a banana tree, and down falls a banana. Then he gets frightened away by a spider. A waterlogged piano is washed up on the shore, and Mickey plays for a trio of dancing seals. A young tiger tries to help by banging on the keys, and Mickey tries to shoo him away. The pair are interrupted by a giant ape, who turns out to be an accomplished pianist himself, but ends up smashing the piano. Mickey tries to fight back, but is intimidated and dances away. He gets chased by a lion, who accidentally jumps into a crocodile's mouth. Mickey finds himself riding on a turtle, which swims away.

Voice cast
 Mickey Mouse: Walt Disney

Reception
In Mickey's Movies: The Theatrical Films of Mickey Mouse, Gijs Grob writes: "The Castaway was a short built around reused, inferior material, and it shows: the cartoon is enjoyable, but Mickey's looks are wildly inconsistent, there's not even a hint of a story, and the whole film feels like a throwback to 1929."

However, on the Disney Film Project, Ryan Kilpatrick praises the short: "This is a very fun short, although there are not a ton of gags, and none nearly as good as Traffic Troubles or some of the other funny Mickey shorts. There is a tone of happiness that is set almost from the beginning, as Mickey is tossed by the waves on his little raft. Even though things are bleak, Mickey is smiling. It is this cheerful optimism that makes Mickey so appealing."

Home media
The short was released on December 7, 2004, on Walt Disney Treasures: Mickey Mouse in Black and White, Volume Two: 1929-1935.

References

External links

 

1931 short films
1931 animated films
1931 films
1930s Disney animated short films
Mickey Mouse short films
Films about castaways
American black-and-white films
Columbia Pictures short films
Columbia Pictures animated short films
Films directed by Wilfred Jackson
Films set on islands
1930s American films